Clitocybe subcordispora is a rare species of agaric fungus in the family Tricholomataceae. Found in northern Europe, it was described as new to science in 1969 by Finnish mycologist Harri Harmaja. It is similar to species in the Clitocybe metachroa complex, but can be distinguished from them by its smaller spores, which measure 4.5–6.0 by 3.0–4.0 µm.

References

External links

subcordispora
Fungi described in 1969
Fungi of Europe